Proforestation is the practice of protecting existing natural forests to foster continuous growth, carbon accumulation, and structural complexity. It is recognized as an important forest based strategy for addressing the global crises in climate and biodiversity. Forest restoration can be a strategy for climate change mitigation. Proforestation complements other forest-based solutions like afforestation, reforestation and improved forest management.

Allowing proforestation in some secondary forests will increase their accumulated carbon and biodiversity over time. Strategies for proforestation include rewilding, such as reintroducing apex predators and keystone species as, for example, predators keep the population of herbivores in check (which reduce the biomass of vegetation). Another strategy is establishing wildlife corridors connecting isolated protected areas.

Definition
Proforestation refers specifically to enabling continuous forest growth uninterrupted by active management or timber harvesting, a term coined by scientists William Moomaw, Susan Masino, and Edward Faison.

Proforestation is a natural climate solution that addresses climate mitigation and adaptation by prioritizing natural processes and regeneration in existing forests to optimize cumulative carbon and ecological complexity.

Proforestation seeks to strengthen and sustain complexity and carbon accumulation in forest ecosystems. As ecologist Ed Faison states, "forests provide these services incredibly well when left alone; in fact over time unmanipulated forests develop the greatest complexity and accumulated carbon storage and therefore serve as models for "ecological forestry" techniques.

Proforestation differs from agroforestry or the cultivation of forest plantations, the latter consisting of similarly aged trees of just one or two species. Plantations can be an efficient source of wood but often come at the expense of natural forests and cultivate little habitat for biodiversity, such as dead and fallen trees or understory plants. Further, once factoring in emissions from clearing the land and the decay of plantation waste and products at the end of their often brief lifecycles (e.g. paper products), plantations sequester 40 times less carbon than natural forests.

Proforestation is specifically recommended in “World Scientists’ Warning of a Climate Emergency, as a means to “quickly curtail habitat and biodiversity loss” and protect “high carbon stores” and areas “with the capacity to rapidly sequester carbon.”

Proforestation is part of a suite of forest-based climate solutions that includes avoided conversion, afforestation, reforestation and improved forest management.

Benefits 
Proforestation offers many benefits, from sequestering carbon for climate change mitigation and sustaining biodiversity, to providing ecosystem services, including water filtration, flood buffering, and maintaining soil health.

Carbon Sequestration
This is an enormous amount (more than was emitted by the US, the UK, Germany and China since the Industrial Revolution) and forests will play an essential role in this removal.
   
In the United States, forests currently remove enough atmospheric  to reduce national net emissions by 11 percent each year. And each additional 8.6 million hectares of land regenerated to natural forest would sequester another 1 billion tons of carbon by 2100.

Research has found that in complex forests of all types, the largest one percent of trees (by diameter) store about half of the carbon. Facilitating growth of larger trees will increase carbon sequestration. 
Research also found that replacing old growth forests with young forests, even counting carbon ‘sequestered’ in long-lasting wood products (e.g. houses), leads to an overall increase in carbon emissions and that proforestation leads to the largest carbon storage capability. Compared to clearcutting, complex forest ecosystems retain more than twice the carbon.

Sustaining Biodiversity
Wilderness areas are examples of proforestation and have been shown to reduce the rate of extinction at broad scales. Primary forests in some regions have been shown to hold far more biodiversity than “disturbed forests.” According to a meta-analysis of 138 studies of tropical forest ecosystems, researchers found that “most forms of forest degradation have an overwhelmingly detrimental effect on tropical biodiversity,” leading them to conclude that “when it comes to maintaining tropical biodiversity, there is no substitute for primary forests.” 
Proforestation also results in greater cumulative carbon storage and structural complexity compared to that found in similar forests that are actively managed. Enhanced structural complexity is achieved via dynamic natural processes and disturbances which often give rise to a greater abundance and diversity of flora and fauna. Proforestation is therefore a powerful forest-based strategy that can help address the global crises in climate and biodiversity.

Providing Ecosystem Services
Forests provide a variety of ecosystem services: cleaning the air, accumulating carbon, filtering water, and reducing flooding and erosion. Forests are the most biodiverse land-based ecosystem, and provide habitat for a vast array of animals, birds, plants and other life. They can provide food and material and also opportunities for recreation and education. Research has found that forest plantations “may result in reduced diversity and abundance of pollinators compared with natural forests that have greater structural and plant species diversity.”

Increasing Forest and Community Resilience
1.6 billion people worldwide depend on forests for their livelihoods, including 300-350 million (half of whom are Indigenous peoples) who live near or within “dense forests” and depend almost entirely on these ecosystems for their survival. Rural households in Asia, Africa, and Latin America also depend on forests for about a quarter of their total incomes, with about half of this in the form of food, fodder, energy, building materials and medicine.  
Proforestation can protect full native biodiversity and support the forests and other land types that provide resources we need. For example, research has found that old growth and complex forests are more resistant to the effects of climate change. One study found that taller trees had increased drought resistance, being able to capture and retain water better, due to their deeper root system and larger biomass. This means that even in dry conditions, these trees continued to photosynthesize at a higher rate than smaller trees.   
Further, old-growth forests have been shown to be more resistant to fires compared to young forests with trees that have thinner bark and with more fuel available for increasing temperatures and fire damage. Proforestation can help to reduce fire risks to forests and the surrounding communities. They can also help absorb water and prevent flooding to surrounding communities. Considering the variety of ecosystem services complex forests provide, sustaining healthy forests means adjacent communities will be better off as well.

Policy and media
Proforestation was featured in July 2019 on NEXT by the New England News Collaborative on New England Public Radio  and on the EnviroShow. It has also been highlighted in major editorials, in a letter signed by 370 top scientists with expertise in climate, ecology and health, and recommended specifically in “World Scientists’ Warning of a Climate Emergency, as a means to “quickly curtail habitat and biodiversity loss” and protect “high carbon stores” and areas “with the capacity to rapidly sequester carbon.”

Leveraging nature-based solutions is consistent with the recommendations of  the Paris Agreement and the Intergovernmental Panel on Climate Change (IPCC) and the goals of the US Climate Alliance. Nature-based solutions can counteract the negative climate, environmental and ecological effects of deforestation and forest manipulation and extraction.

In August 2019, an IPCC Special Report titled “Climate Change and Land” identified land use as a major driver of and a major solution to the climate crisis. A piece in The Conversation referred to the IPCC Special Report and highlighted the importance of natural forests and proforestation. Climate activist Bill McKibben came out against biomass and in favor of proforestation in an article titled "Don’t Burn Trees to Fight Climate Change—Let Them Grow" in the New Yorker. This policy position was echoed in a blog piece co-released by the Nicholas School at Duke University Duke and the Cary Institute for Ecosystem Studies.

Proforestation was also prominently featured at the Climate Action Network International. Recent press releases on proforestation include Trinity College, Frontiers, and Symposium at Harvard Forest.

References

Forest management